The Visitors is a 1988 Swedish horror film directed by Joakim Ersgård.

Plot 

Frank, Sara and their two children have recently moved into the house of their dreams on the Swedish countryside. Frank is disturbed by mysterious sounds and something tears down the wallpaper from the walls. He contacts a ghost-hunter, Allan. While conducting an experiment, Allan is killed, and Frank has to find out the truth himself. What's so special with the mysterious room in the attic?

Cast 
 Kjell Bergqvist - Frank
 Lena Endre - Sara
 Johannes Brost - Allan
 Joanna Berglund - Lotta
 Jonas Olsson - Peter
  - Brevbäraren
  - Civilpolis
  - Expedit
  - Polis i vägspärr

References

External links 

1988 horror films
1988 films
Swedish horror films
1980s Swedish-language films
1980s Swedish films